Mamta was a Hindi television serial that aired from 9 January 2006 to 12 October 2007 on Zee TV, about the universal theme of motherhood.

Plot
The show is based on the story of a woman named Mamta, who is a surrogate mother to a child named Krish. After the birth, she is told that the baby died during birth. A year later she learns that the baby is alive but in danger. She goes to a new, unknown city where she doesn't know anyone to save the child.

Mamta meets Akshay and they marry but he soon meets with an accident and is thought to have been killed. Mamta discovers she is pregnant with Akshay's child and decides to marry Sid for the sake of the unborn child. Akshay returns and unaware that Mamta is pregnant, he tries to avenge what he thinks is a betrayal. When he realises his mistake, Mamta refuses to forgive him because he tried to kill not only her but also their baby. However, Mamta miscarries and loses the baby. Unable to bear the pain, Mamta leaves everything and moves away.

20 years later
Krish has grown up. Sid married another woman after Mamta moved away and has two grown up daughters - Sanjana and Meera. Meera falls in love with Krish who in turn falls for Sanjana.

Cast
 Neha Mehta as Mamta Srivastav
 Anand Suryavanshi as Akshay Srivastav
 Harshad Chopda / Akshat Gupta / Vijay Bhatia as Karan Srivastav
 Amit Behl as Anand Srivastav 
 Ajay Krishnamoorthi as Sidharth aka Sid
 Krishina Bhatia as Child Krish Srivastav
 Ashok Sinha as Teenager Krish Srivastav 
 Gagan Aryan as Krish Srivastav 
 Aseem Agrawal as Pasha
 Nishigandha Wad as Damyanti Anand Srivastav 
 Narayani Shastri as Mamta Akshay Srivastav
 Anita Kulkarni / Suhasini Mulay as Damyanti Anand Srivastav 
 Amrapali Gupta as Masooma Srivastav
 Preeti Puri as Tanisha Akshay Srivastav / Tanisha Karan Srivastav / Tanisha Vikram Oberoi
 Jhumma Mitra as Fulwari
 Parineeta Borthakur as Anamika 
 Neha Sharad as Shaina, Sid's mother
 Megha Gupta as Satya Akshay Srivastav
 Muskaan Mihani as Masooma Srivastav
 Neha Marda as Simran 
 Neetha Shetty as Sanjana 
 Jyostsna Karyekar as Dadi 
 Jayati Bhatia as Mishti
 Akansha as Mimi
 Abhishek Ohri as Aarav
 Shruti Sharma as Meera
 Vaishnavi Mahant as Vasundhara
 Harsh Vashisht as Vikram Oberoi
 Khyaati Khandke Keswani as Siddharth's Wife
 Siraj Mustafa Khan as Satya's Boyfriend
 Sumukhi Pendse as Karan's Real Mother 
 Anang Desai as Mamta's Uncle
 Sanjay Mitra
 Dolly Bindra

External links
Official Site

References

Indian television soap operas
Zee TV original programming
2006 Indian television series debuts
2007 Indian television series endings